Pope County is a county in the U.S. state of Minnesota. As of the 2020 census, the population was 11,308. Its county seat is Glenwood. The county was formed in 1862 and organized in 1866.

History
Pope County was identified by the state legislature in 1862 and named for John Pope, a Union Army general who had worked as a surveyor in the area. Its organization was effected in 1866.

Pope County was the location of several protests against the CU Powerline in the 1970s.

Geography

The Chippewa River flows south through the county's western part. The Little Chippewa River flows south-southwest through its central part, discharging into the Chippewa southeast of Cyrus. The East Branch Chippewa River flows south-southwest through the eastern part of the county toward its union with the Chippewa in neighboring Swift County. The county terrain consists of low rolling hills, carved with drainages and dotted with lakes and ponds. The area is devoted to agriculture. The terrain slopes to the south and west, with its highest point near the northeast corner at 1,388' (423m) ASL.

Major highways

  Minnesota State Highway 9
  Minnesota State Highway 28
  Minnesota State Highway 29
  Minnesota State Highway 55
  Minnesota State Highway 104
  Minnesota State Highway 114

Airports
 Glenwood Municipal Airport (D32)
 Starbuck Municipal Airport (GHW)

Adjacent counties

 Douglas County - north
 Stearns County - east
 Kandiyohi County - southeast
 Swift County - south
 Stevens County - west
 Grant County - northwest

Protected areas

 Bruce Hitman Heron Rookery Scientific and Natural Area
 Farwell State Wildlife Management Area
 Glacial Lakes State Park
 Langhei Scientific and Natural Area
 Little Jo State Wildlife Management Area
 Lowry State Wildlife Management Area
 New Prairie State Wildlife Management Area
 Noordmans State Wildlife Management Area
 Skarpness State Wildlife Management Area
 Van Luik State Wildlife Management Area
 Wade State Wildlife Management Area

Major lakes

 Amelia Lake
 Goose Lake
 Lake Emily
 Lake Johanna
 Lake Minnewaska
 Lake Reno (part)
 Lake Simon
 Pelican Lake
 Pike Lake
 Scandinavian Lake

Demographics

2000 census
As of the 2000 census, there were 11,236 people, 4,513 households, and 3,064 families in the county. The population density was 16.8/sqmi (6.47/km2). There were 5,827 housing units at an average density of 8.70/sqmi (3.36/km2/km2). The racial makeup of the county was 98.85% White, 0.20% Black or African American, 0.18% Native American, 0.08% Asian, 0.01% Pacific Islander, 0.18% from other races, and 0.50% from two or more races. 0.51% of the population were Hispanic or Latino of any race. 38.8% were of Norwegian and 31.6% German ancestry.

There were 4,513 households, out of which 29.70% had children under the age of 18 living with them, 59.00% were married couples living together, 5.90% had a female householder with no husband present, and 32.10% were non-families. 28.70% of all households were made up of individuals, and 16.10% had someone living alone who was 65 years of age or older. The average household size was 2.42 and the average family size was 2.99.

The county population contained 24.80% under the age of 18, 6.70% from 18 to 24, 23.10% from 25 to 44, 23.80% from 45 to 64, and 21.50% who were 65 years of age or older. The median age was 42 years. For every 100 females there were 96.90 males. For every 100 females age 18 and over, there were 92.90 males.

The median income for a household in the county was $35,633, and the median income for a family was $42,818. Males had a median income of $30,452 versus $20,511 for females. The per capita income for the county was $19,032. About 5.80% of families and 8.80% of the population were below the poverty line, including 9.40% of those under age 18 and 12.10% of those age 65 or over.

2020 Census

Communities

Cities

 Brooten (part)
 Cyrus
 Farwell
 Glenwood (county seat)
 Long Beach
 Lowry
 Sedan
 Starbuck
 Villard
 Westport

Unincorporated communities
 Grove Lake
 Terrace

Ghost town
 New Prairie

Townships

 Bangor Township
 Barsness Township
 Ben Wade Township
 Blue Mounds Township
 Chippewa Falls Township
 Gilchrist Township
 Glenwood Township
 Grove Lake Township
 Hoff Township
 Lake Johanna Township
 Langhei Township
 Leven Township
 Minnewaska Township
 New Prairie Township
 Nora Township
 Reno Township
 Rolling Forks Township
 Walden Township
 Westport Township
 White Bear Lake Township

Government and politics
Pope County has been a swing district in the past, but strongly supported the Republican nominee in the last three presidential elections.

See also
 National Register of Historic Places listings in Pope County, Minnesota

References

External links
 Pope County government’s website
 Pope County Historical Society
 Pope County GenWeb Project Helping people find their roots in Pope County. Part of the MNGenWeb and USGenWeb Projects.

 
Minnesota counties
1866 establishments in Minnesota
Populated places established in 1866